Falcomonas is a genus of cryptophytes placed in the family Chroomonadaceae.

References

Cryptomonad genera